Rose Gana Fomban Leke is a Cameroonian malariologist and Emeritus Professor of Immunology and Parasitology at the University of Yaounde I.

Early life and education 
When Leke was growing up she suffered from malaria multiple times, it was a normal part of life. She was first interested in medicine due to treatment she received for lung abscess in Limbe when she was six years old. Her mother never went to school, however her father was a school teacher, and both encouraged her to pursue educational opportunities. She went to Saint Mary-of-the-Woods College, Indiana in 1966 for her undergraduate studies, and then University of Illinois at Urbana–Champaign for her masters in the lab of David Silverman. Leke pursued her PhD, entitled 'Murine plasmodia: chronic, virulent and self-limiting infections', at the Université de Montréal in 1975.

Research 
Leke's research has focussed on pregnancy-associated malaria, in which even women who have developed immunity to the severest forms of malaria can be stricken by a life-threatening form of the disease, with implications on the health of the baby. She established a long-time collaboration with Diana Taylor at the University of Hawaii at Manoa to investigate this condition. Together they published a study in 2018 that indicated that increased numbers of parasites during pregnancy-associated malaria actually conferred better protection in the baby to future malaria infections, and suggested that a less-severe pregnancy-associated infection may predispose the child towards greater incidence of disease.

Awards and recognition 
Leke has been a senior member of many organisations in the fields of immunology and malaria. Leke established the Cameroon Coalition Against Malaria. She was president of the Federation of African Immunological Societies between 1997 and 2001, as well as a council member of the International Union of Immunological Societies from 1998 to 2004. In 2002 a presidential decree made Leke the Chair of the Board of Directors of Cameroon's National Medical Research Institute. Leke won the 2011 Kwame Nkrumah Scientific Award for Women, form the African Union, alongside five other recipients. Leke retired from senior university positions in 2013, when she was head of the Department of Medicine and Director of the Biotechnology Centre at the University of Yaoundé I. University of Ghana invited her for the  2014 Aggrey‐Fraser‐Guggisberg Memorial Lecturer. After that she got Doctor Honoris Causa (DSc) from University of Ghana. In 2015 Leke was elected an honorary international fellow of the American Society of Tropical Medicine and Hygiene, and established the Higher Institute for Growth in Health Research for Women Consortium to mentor women scientists in Cameroon. During the 2018 World Health Assembly, Geneva, she was honoured as a Heroine of Health by Women in Global Health and General Electric Healthcare, and in 2019 she was ceremonially named Queen Mother of the Cameroon Medical Community, by the Cameroon Medical Council. She is on the World Health Organization Malaria Policy Advisory Committee and the International Health Regulations Emergency Committee of Polio Eradication.

Personal life 
Leke has many grandchildren.

References

Living people
Cameroonian scientists
Fellows of the African Academy of Sciences
World Health Organization officials
University of Illinois Urbana-Champaign alumni
Université de Montréal alumni
Saint Mary-of-the-Woods College alumni
Malariologists
Year of birth missing (living people)